The Métis National Council is the representative body of the Métis people of northwestern Canada. The MNC represents the Métis Nation both nationally and internationally, receiving direction from the elected leadership of the Métis Nation's provincial-level governments. The goal of the MNC is to "secure a healthy space for the Métis Nation's on-going existence within the Canadian federation".

History
The National Council was formed in 1983 to support the recognition of the Métis as a distinct ethnicity who identify separately from other aboriginal groups, share Métis Nation ancestry (e.g. the Northwest and Red River, Manitoba settlements) and form recognized communities. This Council was formed to advocate at the federal level in Canada, which became particularly important with Section 35 of the Constitution Act, 1982. It is a recognized voice of the Métis people in five Canadian provinces to the Government of Canada, and represents these Métis people on the international stage. The National Council is governed by a Board of Governors made up of the presidents of the provincial Métis organizations and the national president. A former national president of the Council is Yvon Dumont, who went on to become the Lieutenant Governor of Manitoba. The current president of the Métis National Council is Cassidy Caron

Indigenous Affairs Canada, the relevant federal ministry, deals with the MNC; on April 13, 2017 the two parties signed the Canada-Metis Nation Accord, with the goal of working with the Metis Nation, as represented by the Metis National Council on a Nation to Nation basis.

Metis re-organization of 2020s 
Six Métis communities in Northern Alberta broke away from the Metis Nation of Alberta (MNA) in early 2020, just as the same that the MNA was in a dispute with the Metis National Council (MNC).  The confluence of the two conflicts created a major restructuring of Metis organizations in Western Canada.

At issue are such fundamentals as who is Metis and which organizations should have the democratic mandate to speak for the Metis to the federal and provincial governments.

Disputes between provincial Metis organizations

Definitions of who is Metis 
One source of tension in the dispute between provincial organizations is a disagreement over who is considered Métis.

The Manitoba Metis Federation (MMF)’s official position adopted in 2019, is that membership in Metis organizations must only be open to people with ancestors within the Metis "homeland"': consisting of the provinces of Alberta, Saskatchewan and Manitoba, as well as parts of north-eastern British Columbia, the southern Northwest Territories, and northern halves of the U.S. States of Montana, and North Dakota, and a small part of Minnesota.

In September 2021 the MMF left the Métis National Council (MNC) over membership issues involving the Métis Nation of Ontario (MNO). "We view this not as MMF leaving MNC," wrote MMF President David Chartrand, "rather it is the MNC that has abandoned the MMF and the true Métis Nation." Chartrand further stated the MMF had passed a resolution that the MMF should withdraw from the MNC "should MNO continue to be allowed a seat at the governance table while they – by their own admission – have nearly 80 per cent non-Métis Nation Citizens in their registry." The Métis National Council has stated that they reject the idea of new Ontario Métis communities. 

The National Council suspended the membership of the Métis Nation of Ontario (MNO) in 2020, due to concerns that 90% of the purported Métis who have registered with the Ontario group did not fulfill the requirements of citizenship put in place by the National Council in 2002, notably the requirement for an ancestral link to the Métis homelands and the Red River area specifically. The Ontario group granted memberships to people from four disputed communities: Mattawa, Georgian Bay, Killarney, and Temiskaming, claiming these groups consist of Métis people, and not simply regions inhabited by First Nations individuals and some settlers, but without cultural ties to the recognized Métis communities.

Agreements between the federal government and provincial organizations 
The Metis Nation of Alberta, Metis Nation – Saskatchewan, and Metis Nation of Ontario signed self-government agreements with the government of Canada in 2017 or 2018, whereas the Manitoba Metis Federation and Métis Nation British Columbia did not. The three provincial organizations formed a "tri-council" and asked that the federal government deal directly with them and not with the MNC and met with Indigenous Relations Minister Carolyn Bennet in January 2020.

Interim president and lack of board meetings 
In November 2019 MNC’s president, Clément Chartier, announced he would reduce his duties and allow MMF president David Chartrand to become the "national spokesperson" for MNC until a new president could be elected in April.  However, Chartrand was never officially made interim president, and no board meeting was convened to sanction the change.
Ultimately, the general assembly scheduled for April was cancelled due to COVID-19, so the situation was not resolved.

Fort McKay Metis and the creation of the Alberta Métis Federation 

In 2019 the Fort McKay Metis Community Association (whose membership was largely the same as the region's Metis Nation of Alberta "local") voted to secede from the Metis Nation of Alberta.  This prompted other community associations in Alberta to likewise secede.  The separatist bodies then united in 2021 under a loose umbrella group called the Alberta Metis Federation.  This group was recognized by the Manitoba Metis Federation despite protests from the Metis Nation of Alberta.

Current structure 
The MNC is composed of several provincial Métis organizations, the number of which has varied over time.  They are:
 Métis Nation British Columbia
 Métis Nation of Alberta
 Métis Nation - Saskatchewan
 Métis Nation of Ontario

Note that the Manitoba Metis Federation (MMF) withdrew from the MNC in September 2021.

Within each provincial organization are regional councils.

Presidents
 Yvon Dumont (1988–1993)
 Gerald Morin (1993–2003)
 Audrey Poitras (January 12, 2003 interim President and National spokesperson),
 Clément Chartier (2003–2021)
 Cassidy Caron (2021-)

References

 Barkwell, Lawrence J. The History of the Manitoba Metis Federation. Winnipeg: Louis Riel Institute, 2018. 
 Barkwell, Lawrence J., Leah Dorion, and Audreen Hourie. Metis legacy Michif culture, heritage, and folkways. Métis legacy series, v. 2. Saskatoon: Gabriel Dumont Institute, 2006. 
 Barkwell, Lawrence J., Leah Dorion and Darren Prefontaine. "Metis Legacy: A Historiography and Annotated Bibliography". Winnipeg: Pemmican Publications Inc. and Saskatoon: Gabriel Dumont Institute, 2001. 
 Ens, Gerhard J. and Joe Sawchuk. From New Peoples to New Nations: Aspects of Metis History and Identity from the Eighteenth to Twenty-First Centuries. Toronto: University of Toronto Press, 2016.

External links

 

Métis organizations
Indigenous rights organizations in Canada
Métis in Canada